U, Bomsi & Me is a Hindi language film released in 2005.

Plot
The film is based on three married men and how they face their problems.

Raghavan also known as Raga, is from Tamil Nadu and is a clumsy guy. He loves to watch cricket with beer and is married to Raji who is a lecturer, hates cricket and, is obsessed about cleanliness.

Bomsi, a Parsi and an avid smoker, just wants to be rich and wants to buy a house in a big Parsi colony. He is married to Shenaaz who is a sales girl in a fashion magazine and wants a child but so far the couple has been unable to conceive.

Sam Mac Patel, a half Gujarati and half Punjabi boy is a radio jockey and wants to be a famous writer. His wife is Monica, an air hostess who is always away from him. They spend most of their time apart leading both to be suspicious of the other person.

Cast
Gautam Rode as Sam Mac Patel
Sonal Sehgal as Monica
Vivek Madan as Raghavan
Kranti Redkar as Raji
 Bobby Bahl as Bomsi
Vidya Malvade as Shehnaz

Reception
As per reviews, the movie consisted of only a few good moments, but it is not worth going to the theatres for.

References

2000s Hindi-language films